Ilarion Šišević ( 1219) was the Serbian Orthodox bishop of Zeta and Hum in the first half of the 13th century. He was a disciple of Archbishop Sava, and was a hieromonk of Hilandar during Sava's trip to the Patriarch Manuel I of Constantinople in Nicaea (1219). After the autocephaly of the Serbian Church (15 August 1219), hegumen Metodije of Hilandar was appointed the bishop of Raška and Ilarion was appointed the bishop of Zeta; Raška and Zeta were the central regions of the Medieval Serbian state. Ilarion was thus the first bishop of Zeta. He was also the bishop of Hum, seated at the Monastery of the Holy Mother of God in Ston (now Croatia). In literature, he is also known as Ilarije or Ilarion Šišević (Иларион Шишeвић), based on local tradition, which claims that he was born in the Šišović village in the tribal region of Građani. In the historical-anthropological work Riječka nahija u Crnoj Gori (1911) by Andrija Jovićević, local folklore has been collected, including notes on Ilarion and his family.

References

Sources
 
 

Medieval Serbian Orthodox bishops
Medieval Serbian Orthodox clergy
Bishops of Zahumlje-Herzegovina
13th-century Serbian people
13th-century deaths
12th-century births
People of the Grand Principality of Serbia
People of the Kingdom of Serbia (medieval)
Medieval Athos
Athonite Fathers
People associated with Hilandar Monastery